The 2011–12 Temple Owls men's basketball team represented Temple University in the 2011–12 NCAA Division I men's basketball season. The team played their home games at the Liacouras Center, which has a capacity of 10,206; as well as one game each at the Palestra and Wells Fargo Center. They are in their 30th season as a member of the Atlantic 10 Conference. In their previous season, Temple compiled a record of 26–8 and reached the NCAA tournament. The team returned four starters from the previous season, but lost power forward Lavoy Allen to graduation. He is replaced by incoming recruit Will Cummings and transfer Dalton Pepper. Anthony Lee will be eligible after red shirting last year.

Preseason

In 2011–12, the Temple Owls men's basketball team were in their 30th season as a member of the Atlantic 10 Conference. Since 1997, the team has played their home games at the Liacouras Center, which has a capacity of 10,206. In the previous season, the Owls went 14–2 in Atlantic 10 play, earning a two seed in the 2011 Atlantic 10 men's basketball tournament, where they lost in the semifinals to Richmond. The team earned an at-large bid to the 2011 NCAA Division I men's basketball tournament as a seven seed, and defeated Penn State in the round of 64 on a last-second shot by guard Juan Fernandez. The win snapped coach Fran Dunphy's 11-game losing streak in the NCAA Tournament, the longest on record. Temple's season ended with a double overtime loss to San Diego State in the round of 32 as the Owls compiled a record of 26–8.

Temple lost starting power forward Lavoy Allen to graduation. As a senior, Allen placed third on the team in scoring with 11.6 points per game and led the team in rebounding with 8.6 rebounds per game. He was a three-time All-Atlantic 10 Defensive Team honoree and a two-time All-Atlantic 10 First Team selection. He finished his career as the school's all-time leading rebounder with 1,147 boards and ranks 24th on the career scoring list with 1,421 points. In the 2011 NBA draft, Allen was selected with the 50th overall pick by the Philadelphia 76ers. Reserve center Dutch Gaitley also graduated. After redshirting the 2010–11 season with foot injuries, forward Craig Williams transferred to Texas Christian University and was eligible to compete immediately.

Temple assistant Matt Langel accepted the Colgate head coaching job on April 28, 2011. Langel had coached at Temple since Fran Dunphy was hired in 2006. Langel was responsible for recruiting Juan Fernandez to Temple, once driving ten hours in a compact car to find him. He was replaced by Boston University assistant Dwayne Killings. Killings served as assistant director of basketball operations at Temple from 2006 to 2009. In his only season at Boston University, Killings helped the team win the 2011 America East men's basketball tournament and earn a bid to the NCAA Tournament.

On October 13, 2011. Temple was predicted to finish second in the Atlantic 10 behind Xavier and received four first-place votes. Ramone Moore and Juan Fernandez were Preseason First Team All-Conference selections, Scootie Randall was a Preseason Third Team All-Conference selection, and Anthony Lee was a Preseason All-Rookie Team selection. Jeff Goodman of CBS Sports named Temple Owls the second best team in the Atlantic 10 and highlighted the development of Michael Eric and Anthony Lee as factors for a successful season.

Recruiting

Incoming signees
The sole member of the Owls' 2011 recruiting class was Will Cummings, a point guard from Jacksonville, Florida who committed on September 4, 2010. He averaged 18.1 points, 8.1 assists, 4.0 steals per game as a senior at Providence School, in addition to carrying a 4.0 grade point average. The Jacksonville Times-Union named him the high school boys basketball player of the year. Cummings drew attention from Stanford, Miami (Fl.), and Boston College, but chose Temple because of their winning tradition.

In addition to Temple's recruiting class, the Owls signed transfer Dalton Pepper from West Virginia. Due to NCAA rules, he will be forced to sit out the 2011–12 season as a redshirt and will have two years of eligibility remaining. In his career at Pennsbury High School, Pepper scored a school-record 2,207 points, grabbed 962 rebounds, and garnered 2009 Pennsylvania Big School Player of the Year recognition from the Associated Press. In 62 games with the Mountaineers, Pepper averaged 3.5 points and 10.1 minutes per game and helped West Virginia reach the 2010 Final Four.

2012–13 team recruits

Roster

Schedule

|- align="center" bgcolor="#D8FFEB"
| 1
| November 14
| Penn
| W 73–67 (OT)
| Juan Fernandez – 19
| Micheal Eric – 10
| Juan Fernandez – 5
| The Palestra, Philadelphia, PA 
| 1–0
|- align="center" bgcolor="#D8FFEB"
| 2
| November 17
| Western Michigan
| W 69–55
| Ramone Moore – 15
| Eric – 15
| Fernandez – 6
| José Miguel Agrelot Coliseum, San Juan, PR
| 2–0
|- align="center" bgcolor="#FFE6E6"
| 3
| November 18
| Purdue 
| L 85–77
| Moore – 27
| Eric – 8
| Moore/Rahlir Hollis-Jefferson/T.J. DiLeo – 3
| José Miguel Agrelot Coliseum, San Juan, PR
| 2–1
|- align="center" bgcolor="#D8FFEB"
| 4
| November 20
| Wichita State 
| W 78–74 (OT)
| Moore – 23
| Eric – 12
| Khalif Wyatt – 4
| José Miguel Agrelot Coliseum, San Juan, PR
| 3–1
|- align="center" bgcolor="#FFE6E6"
| 5
| November 27
| Bowling Green
| L 67–64
| Wyatt – 19
| Anthony Lee – 9
| Wyatt/Moore – 4
| Stroh Center, Bowling Green, OH
| 3–2
|-

|- align="center" bgcolor="#D8FFEB"
| 6 
| December 3 
| Central Michigan 
| W 86–74
| Wyatt – 23
| Moore – 8
| Wyatt – 9
| Liacouras Center, Philadelphia, PA
| 4–2
|- align="center" bgcolor="#D8FFEB" 
| 7 
| December 7 
| Toledo 
| W 77–58
| Aaron Brown – 19
| Lee – 9
| Moore – 7
| Savage Arena, Toledo, OH
| 5–2
|- align="center" bgcolor="#D8FFEB" 
| 8
| December 10 
| Villanova 
| W 78–67
| Moore – 32
| Hollis-Jefferson – 14
| Fernandez – 4
| Liacouras Center, Philadelphia, PA
| 6–2
|- align="center" bgcolor="#FFE6E6" 
| 9 
| December 17 
| Texas 
| L 65–77
| 
| 
| 
| Frank Erwin Center, Austin, TX
| 6–3
|- align="center" bgcolor="#D8FFEB" 
| 10 
| December 19 
| Rice 
| W 77–70
| 
| 
| 
| Tudor Fieldhouse, Houston, TX
| 7–3
|- align="center" bgcolor="#D8FFEB" 
| 11 
| December 28 
| Buffalo 
| W 87–85
| 
| 
| 
| Liacouras Center, Philadelphia, PA
| 8–3
|- align="center" bgcolor="#D8FFEB" 
| 12 
| December 30 
| Delaware 
| W 66–63
| 
| 
| 
| Bob Carpenter Center, Newark, DE
| 9–3

|- align="center" bgcolor="#D8FFEB" 
| 13
| January 4 
| Duke 
| W 78–73
| 
| 
| 
| Wells Fargo Center, Philadelphia, PA
| 10–3
|- align="center" bgcolor="#D8FFEB"
| 14 
| January 7 
| Dayton 
|  L 77-87
| 
| 
| 
| Liacouras Center, Philadelphia, PA
| 10-4(0-1)
|- align="center" bgcolor="#D8FFEB"
| 15 
| January 11 
| Saint Louis 
|  W 72-67 
| 
| 
| 
| Chaifetz Arena, St. Louis, MO
| 11-4(1-1)
|- align="center" bgcolor="#D8FFEB"
| 16 
| January 14
| Richmond 
|  L 65-76
| 
| 
| 
| Robins Center, Richmond, VA
| 11-5(1-2)
|- align="center" bgcolor="#D8FFEB"
| 17
| January 18 
| La Salle 
|  W 76-70 
| 
| 
| 
| Liacouras Center, Philadelphia, PA
| 12-5(2-2)
|- align="center" bgcolor="#D8FFEB"
| 18
| January 21
| Maryland 
|  W 73-60 
| 
| 
| 
| The Palestra, Philadelphia, PA 
| 13-5(3-2)
|- align="center" bgcolor="#D8FFEB"
| 19
| January 25 
| Charlotte 
|  W 79-57 
| 
| 
| 
| Dale F. Halton Arena, Charlotte, NC
| 14-5(4-2)
|- align="center" bgcolor="#D8FFEB"
| 20 
| January 28
| Saint Joseph's 
|  W 78-60 
| 
| 
| 
| Liacouras Center, Philadelphia, PA
| 15-5(5-2)
|-

|- align="center" bgcolor="#D8FFEB"
| 21
| February 1 
| Fordham 
|  W 78-60 
| 
| 
| 
| Liacouras Center, Philadelphia, PA
| 16-5(6-2)
|- align="center" bgcolor="#D8FFEB"
| 22
| February 4
| Rhode Island 
|  W 73-56 
| 
| 
| 
| Ryan Center, Kingston, RI
| 17-5(7-2)
|- align="center" bgcolor="#D8FFEB"
| 23
| February 8 
| George Washington 
|  W 79-72 
| 
| 
| 
| Liacouras Center, Philadelphia, PA
| 18-5(8-2)
|- align="center" bgcolor="#D8FFEB"
| 24
| February 11
| Xavier 
|  W 85-72 
| 
| 
| 
| Liacouras Center, Philadelphia, PA
| 19-5(9-2)
|- align="center" bgcolor="#D8FFEB"
| 25 
| February 15 
| St. Bonaventure 
|  W 76-70 
| 
| 
| 
| Reilly Center, Olean, NY
| 20-5(10-2)
|- align="center" bgcolor="#D8FFEB"
| 26 
| February 18 
| Duquesne 
|  W 78-59 
| 
| 
| 
| Liacouras Center, Philadelphia, PA
| 21-5(11-2)
|- align="center" bgcolor="#D8FFEB"
| 27
| February 22
| La Salle 
|  W 80-79 OT 
| 
| 
| 
| Tom Gola Arena, Philadelphia, PA
| 22-5(12-2)
|- align="center" bgcolor="#D8FFEB"
| 28
| February 25
| Saint Joseph's 
|  L 72-82
| 
| 
| 
| Hagan Arena, Philadelphia, PA
| 22-6(12-3)
|- align="center" bgcolor="#D8FFEB"
| 29 
| February 29
| UMass 
|  W 90-88 OT 
| 
| 
| 
| Liacouras Center, Philadelphia, PA 
| 23-6(13-3)
|- 

|- align="center" bgcolor="#D8FFEB"
| 30
| March 3 
| Fordham 
|  W 80-60 
| 
| 
| 
| Rose Hill Gymnasium, Bronx, NY
| 24-6(14-3)
|- align="center" bgcolor="#D8FFEB"
| 31
| March 9
| UMass
|  L 71-77
| 
| 
| 
| Boardwalk Hall, Atlantic City, NJ
| 24-7
|- align="center" bgcolor="#D8FFEB"
| 32
| March 16
| (12) South Florida
|  L 44-58
| 
|
|
| Nashville, TN
| 24-8
|-
! colspan="2" | 2011–12 team schedule
|}

Season

Preconference season
Behind Juan Fernandez's 19 points, Temple began their season with a 73–67 overtime victory over Penn on November 14, 2011.

Rankings

Awards and honors
Juan Fernandez
Preseason All-Atlantic 10 First Team

Ramone Moore
Preseason All-Atlantic 10 First Team

Scootie Randall
Preseason All-Atlantic 10 Third Team
 
Anthony Lee
Preseason All-Atlantic 10 Rookie Team

References

Temple
Temple Owls men's basketball seasons
Temple
Temple
Temple